The Innocents or Innocents may refer to:

Literature 
 The Innocents (novel), a 1917 novel by Sinclair Lewis
 The Innocents (play), a 1950 play by William Archibald based on Henry James's The Turn of the Screw
 The Innocents, a 2012 novel by Francesca Segal
 The Innocents , a 2019 novel by Michael Crummey
 "Innocents", a 1992 short story by Ian McDonald

Film and television 

 The Innocents (1961 film), a British film directed by Jack Clayton, based on The Turn of the Screw by Henry James and on Archibald's play
 The Innocents (1963 film) (Los inocentes), an Argentine-Spanish film directed by Juan Antonio Bardem
 The Innocents (1987 film) (Les Innocents), a French film directed by André Téchiné
 Innocents (film), a 2000 British television film directed by Peter Kosminsky
 The Dreamers (2003 film), a Bernardo Bertolucci film (released as (Les) Innocents in some countries)
 The Innocents (2016 film) (Les Innocentes), a film directed by Anne Fontaine
 The Innocents (TV series), a 2018 British supernatural series
 "The Innocents" (Millennium), a 1998 episode
 The Innocents (2021 film), Norwegian film

Music

Bands 
 The Innocents (US band), a 1958–1964 pop group
 The Innocents (Australian band), a power-pop band formed in 1975
 The Innocents (UK band), a 1978–1980 punk band
 Les Innocents, a 1982–1999 French rock band

Albums 
 The Innocents (Erasure album), 1988
 Innocents (video), a 1989 concert video by Erasure
 Innocents (Only Living Witness album), 1996
 Innocents (Moby album), 2013
 The Innocents (Weyes Blood album), 2014

Other uses 
 Holy Innocents' Cemetery (Les Innocents), a disused cemetery in Paris
 Innocents (gang), a 19th-century outlaw gang of road agents from Montana
The Holy Innocents, the children killed on King Herod's order

See also 
 Innocent (disambiguation), includes uses of The Innocent
 Innocence (disambiguation)